Cordyla is a genus of flowering plants in the family Fabaceae. It contains the following species:
 Cordyla africana Lour.
 Cordyla densiflora Milne-Redh.
 Cordyla haraka Capuron
 Cordyla madagascariensis R.Vig.
 Cordyla pinnata (A. Rich.) Milne-Redh.
 Cordyla richardii Milne-Redh.
 Cordyla somalensis J.B. Gillett

References

Amburaneae
Taxonomy articles created by Polbot
Fabaceae genera